Luisiana, officially the Municipality of Luisiana,  is a 4th class municipality in the province of Laguna, Philippines. According to the 2020 census, it has a population of 20,859 people.

Locals call the town Little Amigos Dísmo because of its high elevation and cool climate like the City of Baguio.

History

During the 17th century, there was an area of land in Laguna known as Terreno de Nasonog (Lupaín ng Nasonog in Tagalog). In 1678, Terreno de Nasúnog was divided into three parts: Nasúnog de Lucban, Nasonog de Cavinti, and Nasúnog de Majayjay.

Nasonog de Majayjay later became the town of Luisiana. It was only on April 3, 1854, that ecclesiastical independence was granted to Nasonog by the Governor-General (the Marqués de Novaliches) with the corresponding approval from the Archbishop of Manila, having Don Marcos Bartolomé as its first interim parish priest. Because of the role of Don Luis Bernárdo, which was then regarded as the Father of Luisiana, and his wife Doña Ana, the town was named 'Luis y Ana', later changed to 'Luisiana'.

In 1903, the towns of Cavinti and Luisiana were combined, Pedro Villanueva of Cavinti was elected mayor and it was during his term that the Aglipay Church was founded in April, 1904. The Romana family funded the construction of a couple of Protestant churches. However, on November 12, 1907, under the leadership of Don Blas Oración, through the Civil Commission, Cavinti and Luisiana became independent towns.

In 1948, Visita de Luisiana gained civil independence from Majayjay.

Geography

Luisiana occupies  on a plateau  atop the Sierra Madre mountains.

Barangays

Luisiana is politically subdivided into 23 barangays.

 De La Paz
 Barangay Zone I (Poblacion)
 Barangay Zone II (Poblacion)
 Barangay Zone III (Poblacion)
 Barangay Zone IV (Poblacion)
 Barangay Zone V (Poblacion)
 Barangay Zone VI (Poblacion)
 Barangay Zone VII (Poblacion)
 Barangay Zone VIII (Poblacion)
 San Antonio
 San Buenaventura
 San Diego
 San Isidro
 San José
 San Juan
 San Luis
 San Pablo
 San Pedro
 San Rafaél
 San Roque
 San Salvador
 Santo Domingo
 Santo Tomás

Climate
The climate is cold, humid, and tropical. The average yearly temperature is around 26 °C (78.8 °F).

Demographics

Economy

Luisiana is basically an agricultural town. At the población, there are only a few commercial establishments which cater to the basic services of the people. Most of them still go to Santa Crúz to do their shopping or marketing and to avail themselves of other services not available in their town.

Sources of income of the people of Luisiana are mainly focused on agriculture such as copra, pandan, palay, bamboo and bunliw, with light industry base and service-sector economy. Piggery and poultry farming are also an additional income.

Sister cities
 Makati
 Malaybalay City
 Guipos, Zamboanga del Sur
 Baguio

Gallery

References

External links

[ Philippine Standard Geographic Code]
Philippine Census Information
Local Governance Performance Management System

Municipalities of Laguna (province)